The marché Mont-Bouët (Mont-Bouet market), in Libreville is Gabon's largest market, with hundreds of stalls selling fruits, vegetables, meat, poultry (live and dead), fabric, clothing, jewelry, household goods, traditional medicine and a variety of other goods.  It is easy to get lost in the narrow passageways of the market and there are pickpockets, so visitors should keep track of their money and valuables at all times.

On the outskirts of the market is a large shopping district.  Many of the shops carry a wide variety of the popular print fabrics used to make clothing.  Above many of the shops, local women run restaurants out of their apartments.  Good Middle Eastern and north African food may be had at reasonable prices.

Children wander the market, selling plastic bags for holding goods, bags of drinking water, bean sandwiches and other items for shoppers.

Next to the market is the old location of the gare routier, or major bush taxi stop.  Due to a high incidence of violence and robbery, the main gare is now closed.  Bush taxis must now be obtained on the outskirts of Libreville along the main highways, particularly at PK8 (Point Kilometer 8) along the N1 road.

Across from the market is a prison.  It is a wide, open area surrounded by a high concrete wall.

Notes

Economy of Gabon
Retail markets in Gabon
Buildings and structures in Libreville